Charles Ronald Aldrich was an architect active in Los Angeles and Seattle areas in the early 20th century. He was born in Utica, Michigan, shortly after the Civil War and in 1905 moved to Seattle.

His works include:
Judson C. Rives Building, 424 S. Broadway, Downtown Los Angeles, 10 stories (1906-7)
Central Building, Downtown Seattle (1909)
Fleischmann's Yeast Factory, Sumner, Washington

His career history included:
Architect, Trustee Company, Seattle, WA, c. 1905–1910; 
Principal, C.R. Aldrich, Architect, Seattle, WA, c. 1910–1911. 
Partner, Aldrich and Hunt, Architects, Seattle, WA, c. 1911–1914.

References

Aldrich, Charles Ronald
Aldrich, Charles Ronald